Association of Tennis Professionals (ATP) players Daniil Medvedev and Stefanos Tsitsipas have faced each other 11 times since 2018, with Medvedev leading the rivalry, 7–4. They are considered to be two of the best tennis players of their generation. According to the BBC, "The pair have long had a spiky relationship and, while there is respect and cordiality, an element of drama always appears when they meet".

Medvedev won his first five matches against Tsitsipas, but Tsitsipas has won four of their last six.

Notable matches

2018 Miami Open

Medvedev and Tsitsipas first played each other in the first round of the 2018 Miami Open, when both were ranked outside of the top 50 and were 22 and 19 years old respectively. Medvedev made a comeback after dropping the first set to win  in the third. However, the match is better remembered for a verbal altercation after the players shook hands. Russian Medvedev, upset about some of his opponent's etiquette during the match and especially that Greek Tsitsipas had muttered "bullshit Russian" at the net, yelled at Tsitsipas from his bench, "Man, you better shut your fuck up, okay?" He then got up and began complaining that Tsitsipas had taken a long bathroom break (Medvedev also took one) and took issue with Tsitsipas not apologizing for hitting the net cord during a point. As the chair umpire intervened, Tsitsipas quietly packed his bag to leave the court while Medvedev continued, "Look at me ... He started it ... He's a small kid who doesn't know how to fight".

Tsitsipas later said the "overall ambience" after the match was overly hostile. Of the "bullshit Russian" remark, he has said that Medvedev had been chiding him midmatch for not apologizing for hitting the net cord, but that he "did get pissed and said what I said, which I do regret".

2019 ATP Finals

Tsitsipas scored his first win over Medvedev in their sixth meeting, in the group stage of the 2019 ATP Finals, an event that Tsitsipas eventually won. Tsitsipas never faced break point in the match, winning a close tiebreak in the first set and breaking Medvedev's serve once in the second. He said afterward that "It's a victory that I craved for a long time now".

2022 Australian Open

At the 2022 Australian Open, No. 2 seed Medvedev and No. 4 seed Tsitsipas met in the semifinals. Both players received fines from the ATP because of this match, which was a rematch of their 2021 semifinal that Medvedev won in straight sets. Medvedev was fined AU$12,000 (about US$8,400) for unsportsmanlike conduct toward chair umpire Jaume Campistol. During a changeover in the second set, after dropping his serve with a double fault, Medvedev erupted in frustration, yelling repeatedly at the umpire, "His father can talk every point? Bro, are you stupid? His father can talk every point?! ... Can his father talk every point?!" He later called Campistol a "small cat" for not citing his opponent for on-court coaching. In fact Tsitsipas's father Apostolos Tsitsipas, who often gets coaching warnings at his son's matches, was shouting finable advice (in Greek) from the player's box, something tournament officials eventually laid bare in the fourth set in a "sting operation" using Greek umpire Eva Asderaki-Moore. Tsitsipas failed to win another game after he was given a coaching warning and fined AU$5,000 (about US$3,500). Medvedev managed to dial in on return as the match went on, winning .

Postmatch, Medvedev regretted his reaction to the umpire, saying "I think we can say it was funny, but I was definitely out of my mind".

2022 ATP Finals

Though neither would ultimately make it out of the group stage, Medvedev and Tsitsipas faced off in a win-or-go-home match at the 2022 ATP Finals. After Tsitsipas took the first set relatively comfortably, Medvedev saved three match points in a "dramatic" second-set tiebreaker that he captured on his own fourth set point. However, up a break at the end of the third set, Medvedev failed to serve out the match, partly due to an untimely pair of double faults, and Tsitsipas cruised through the decisive tiebreaker, winning .

Relationship

Former No. 2 Alexander Zverev, a generational rival of both players, said in 2019 that Medvedev and Tsitsipas "have a weird relationship a little bit". Tsitsipas once called Medvedev's game style "boring", but later took it back, saying "He just plays extremely smart and outplays you". Their relationship "thawed" over time and "kind of got better" after they were teammates at the 2021 Laver Cup. Medvedev has since said of Tsitsipas, "I think we respect each other as players but probably not so much on personal level ... We don't have any sort of relationship at all, I would say".

Head-to-head

See also
List of tennis rivalries

References

External links
 Daniil Medvedev vs Stefanos Tsitsipas head-to-head from the ATP Tour

Tennis rivalries